Kadawatha (or Kadawata)  is a large suburb of Colombo, in the Western Province, Sri Lanka. Industrial machines, factories, diesel motor houses, strategic investments and leisure destinations are some of the industries established there. Kadawatha is a collection of many ruralities, including Biyagama, Mahara, Ganemulla, Kirillawala, Rammuthugala, Dalupitiya, Karagahamuna (upper and lower), Biyanwila (upper and lower) and Kirimatiyagaraya.

Kadawatha is mainly administrated by the Mahara Pradeshiya Sabha and some parts by the Biyagama Pradeshiya Sabha.  It is a structured and infrastructure-rich Colombo suburb with the several Schools, Buddhist temples and Catholic and Christian churches. Demographically, Kadawatha area is predominantly Sinhalese and partially Tamils with a majority of them being Buddhists but there is a sizable Catholic and Hindu minority. The residents show a high mobility towards the capital as many of them study or work in Colombo.

Along with recent expressway developments within the island  Kadawatha has been selected as a major Colombo Expressway interchange which connects Southern, Airport and Central expressway. The recently built Kadawatha city bypass  has added great convenience to motorists. The new Court complex, now in operation, is close to city bypass.

History  
In the pre-British era, Kadawatha was a gateway of Colombo and pathway to the Kandy. There are several cities bearing the same name, places that were used for bullock carts to be halted.

Accessing Kadawatha 
The Colombo-Kandy main road (A-1 road) runs through this suburb .Kadawatha is well-connected to neighbouring the some other suburbs of Colombo city, such as Kelaniya, Kiribathgoda, Ragama and Biyagama. Due to unsystematic planning, Kadawatha used to be masses with massive traffic jams during peak hours. Recently, the proper planning of town-side and road infrastructure have drastically reduced this condition. Sri Lanka's first vehicle underpass is being built in Kadawatha, facilitating avoidance of the town-centre by the traffic towards Colombo. In addition, the town will be connecting a major loop of the proposed outer-circular road which expects to connect major suburbs of Colombo.

See also
Dewalapola

References 

Populated places in Western Province, Sri Lanka